Robert Lowther (13 December 1681 – September 1745) was an English landowner, holding the estate of Maulds Meaburn, and colonial governor. He was the eldest son of Richard Lowther and Barbara Prickett.

From 1711 to 1714 and 1715 to 1720, he served as Governor of Barbados.

On 22 June 1731, he married his cousin Katherine Pennington, daughter of Sir Joseph Pennington, 2nd Baronet. They had five children:
James Lowther, 1st Earl of Lonsdale (1736–1802)
Margaret Lowther (1728 – 10 September 1800), married on 19 March 1757 Henry Vane, 2nd Earl of Darlington
Katherine Lowther (d. 21 March 1809), married on 8 April 1765 Harry Powlett, 6th Duke of Bolton
Robert Lowther (1741–1777)
Barbara Lowther, died unmarried

References
Lowther pedigree 2

1681 births
1745 deaths
English landowners
English MPs 1705–1707
Members of the Parliament of Great Britain for English constituencies
British MPs 1707–1708
Governors of Barbados
Robert